Quercus garryana is an oak tree species of the Pacific Northwest, with a range stretching from southern California to southwestern British Columbia. It is commonly known as the Oregon white oak or Oregon oak or, in Canada, the Garry oak. The eponymous Nicholas Garry was deputy governor of the Hudson's Bay Company.

Description

The bark is gray and fissured. It has the characteristic oval profile of other oaks when solitary, but is also known to grow in groves close enough together that crowns may form a canopy. The flowers are catkins, the fruit a small acorn 3⁄4–1 inch (rarely 1 1⁄2 inches) long and 1⁄2–3⁄4 inch broad, with shallow, scaly cups. Its fall color is unspectacular, with many trees turning plain brown. Other individuals may have subtle mixtures of brown, green and yellow, or in less common cases a fairly bright 'peas and corn' effect.

The Oregon white oak is commonly found in the Willamette Valley hosting the mistletoe Phoradendron flavescens. It is also commonly found hosting galls created by wasps in the family Cynipidae. 'Oak apples', green or yellow ball of up to 5 cm in size, are the most spectacular.  They are attached to the undersides of  leaves.  One common species responsible for these galls is Cynips maculipennis.  Other species create galls on stems and leaves.  Shapes vary from spheres to mushroom-shaped to pencil-shaped.

Individual specimens can grow to around 500 years in age, such as those on Sauvie Island near Portland, Oregon.

Taxonomy

Taxonomic history 
David Douglas discovered the species in the 1820s and named it after Nicholas Garry, who was deputy governor of the Hudson's Bay Company from 1822 to 1835 and a supporter of Douglas.

Varieties 
There are three varieties:
Quercus garryana var. garryana – tree to 65 (100) ft. British Columbia south along the Cascades to the California Coast Ranges.
Quercus garryana var. breweri – shrub to 15 ft; leaves velvety underneath. Siskiyou Mountains.
Quercus garryana var. semota – shrub to 15 ft; leaves not velvety underneath. Sierra Nevada.

Distribution
In Oregon, the tree grows on the west side of the Cascade Range, primarily in the Willamette, Umpqua and Rogue River valleys, and along the Columbia River Gorge, as well as in canyons adjacent to the gorge.

In California, the garryana variety grows in the foothills of the Siskiyou and Klamath Mountains, the Coast Ranges of Northern California, and of the west slope of the Cascades.  The semota variety grows in the Sierra Nevada and Coast Ranges as far south as Los Angeles County.

In Washington, the tree grows on the west side of the Cascade Range, particularly in the Puget Sound lowlands, the northeastern Olympic Peninsula, Whidbey Island, the Chehalis river valley, and the San Juan Islands. It also grows in the foothills of the southeastern Cascades and along the Columbia River Gorge.

In British Columbia, the Garry oak grows on the Gulf Islands and southeastern Vancouver Island, from west of Victoria along the east side of the island up to the Campbell River area.  There are also small populations along the Fraser River on the British Columbia mainland. The northernmost population of Garry oak can be found just below 50°N on Savary Island, in the northern stretches of the Strait of Georgia. The Garry oak is the only oak native to British Columbia, and one of only two oaks (along with the bur oak) native to western Canada.

Ecology
It is a drought-tolerant tree. Older specimens are often affected by heart rot.

The acorns are consumed by wildlife and livestock. David Douglas recorded that bears consumed them.

In British Columbia, the Garry oak can be infested by three nonnative insects:  the jumping gall wasp Neuroterus saltatorius, the oak leaf phylloxeran, and the gypsy moth.

While the invasive plant disease commonly called sudden oak death attacks other Pacific Coast native oaks, it has not yet been found on the Oregon white oak.  Most oak hosts of this disease are in the red oak group, while Oregon white oak is in the white oak group.

Quercus garryana woodlands 
Oregon white oak is the only native oak species in British Columbia, Washington, and northern Oregon. In these areas, oak woodlands are seral, or early-successional; they depend on disturbance to avoid being overtaken by Douglas-fir (Pseudotsuga menziesii). The disturbance allowing oak to persist in an area that would otherwise succeed to coniferous forest was primarily fire. Natural wildfires are relatively common in the drier portions of the Pacific Northwest where Oregon white oak is found, but fire suppression has made such events much less common. In addition, early settlers' records, soil surveys, and tribal histories indicate that deliberate burning was widely practiced by the indigenous people of these areas. Fire perpetuated the grasslands that produced food sources such as camas, chocolate lily, bracken fern, and oak; and that provided grazing and easy hunting for deer and elk. Mature Oregon white oaks are fire-resistant, and so would not be severely harmed by grass fires of low intensity. Such fires prevented Douglas-fir and most other conifer seedlings from becoming established, allowing bunch grass prairie and oak woodland to persist. Fire also kept oak woodlands on drier soils free of a shrub understory. Wetter oak woodlands historically had a substantial shrub understory, primarily snowberry. 

Oregon white oak woodlands in British Columbia and Washington are critical habitats for a number of species that are rare or extirpated in these areas, plant, animal, and bryophyte:
Propertius duskywing butterfly Erynnis propertius, sole larval food plant is oak
Bucculatrix zophopasta leaf-mining moth, sole larval food plant is oak
Lewis woodpecker Melanerpes lewis
Slender billed nuthatch Sitta carolinensis aculeata
Sharp tailed snake Contia tenuis
Western gray squirrel Sciurus griseus
Western tanager Piranga ludoviciana
Western wood peewee Contopus sordidulus
Western bluebird Sialia mexicana
Sessile trillium Trillium parviflorum
Banded cord-moss Entosthodon fascicularis
Apple moss Bartramia stricta
(liverwort) Riccia ciliata
Golden Paintbrush Castilleja levisecta

Quercus garryana woodlands create a landscape mosaic of grassland, savanna, woodland, and closed-canopy forest.  This mosaic of varied habitats, in turn, allows many more species to live in this area than would be possible in coniferous forest alone.  Parks Canada states that Garry oak woodlands support more species of plants than any other terrestrial ecosystem in British Columbia.  It grows in a variety of soil types, for instance, rocky outcrops, glacial gravelly outwash, deep grassland soils, and seasonally flooded riparian areas.

The Donation Land Claim Act of 1850 encouraged settlement of Washington and Oregon by the United States and marked the beginning of the end of regular burning by native peoples of the area. The arrival of Europeans also reduced the number of natural fires that took place in Oregon white oak habitat. With fire suppression and conversion to agriculture, oak woodlands and bunch grass prairies were invaded by Douglas-fir, Oregon ash (Fraxinus latifolia), and imported pasture grasses. Oaks were logged to clear land for pasture, and for firewood and fence posts. Livestock grazing trampled and consumed oak seedlings. By the 1990s, more than half the Oregon white oak woodland habitat in the South Puget Sound area of Washington was gone. On Vancouver Island, more than 90% was gone, and on Whidbey Island up to 99% of native understory Oregon white oak habitat is gone. Remaining Oregon white oak woodlands are threatened by urbanization, conversion to Douglas-fir woodland, and invasion by shrubs, both native and nonnative (Scotch broom Cytisus scoparius, sweetbriar rose Rosa eglanteria, snowberry Symphoricarpos albus, Indian plum Oemleria cerasiformis, poison-oak Toxicodendron diversilobum, English holly Ilex aquifolium, bird cherry Prunus avens).
Conversely, oak groves in wetter areas that historically had closed canopies of large trees are becoming crowded with young oaks that grow thin and spindly, due to lack of fires that would clear out seedlings.

Chionodes petalumensis caterpillars feed on oak leaves, including those of Quercus garryana and valley oak (Q. lobata).

Conservation

Oregon white oaks and their ecosystems are the focus of conservation efforts, including communities such as Tacoma, Washington, where an Oak Tree Park has been established; Oak Bay, British Columbia, which is named after the tree; and Corvallis, Oregon, which has protected the oak savannah remnants around Bald Hill. Oak Harbor, Washington, named after the tree and home to Smith Park that contains a dense grove of mature Garry Oak trees, is actively pursuing conservation of the city's namesake tree with the formation of the Oak Harbor Garry Oak Society.

In Southwest Washington, significant acreages of Oregon white oaks are preserved in the Scatter Creek Wildlife Area, in sites such as the Scatter Creek Unit, which contain some of the few remaining areas of south Puget Sound prairie.

In Oak Bay, British Columbia, a fine of up to $10,000 may be issued for each Garry oak tree cut or damaged.

Uses
The mildly sweet (but perhaps unpalatable) acorns are edible, ideally after leaching. The bitterness of the toxic tannic acid would likely prevent anyone from eating enough to become ill. Native Americans ate the acorns raw and roasted, also using them to make a kind of flour.

The hardwood is hard and heavily ring-porous. It has distinctive growth rings and prominent rays. Heartwood can be a deep chocolate brown color and sapwood will vary from golden brown to nearly white. This makes it particularly attractive to woodworkers, however it can be difficult to use in woodworking without experiencing warping and cracking. Although it was popularly used around the turn of the 20th century, historically, the tree has not been regarded as having significant commercial value and is frequently destroyed as land is cleared for development. The wood is suitable for making fence posts. With similar qualities to those of other white oaks, the wood has been used experimentally in Oregon for creating casks in which to age wine. In Washington, it has been used for aging single malt whiskey since the 2010s. Oregon white oak barrels are said to give the product "burnt sugar notes, marshmallow sweetness, and a light floral character that showcases the best of the Garry oak".
When used as firewood, Oregon white oak produces  burned.

References
Footnotes

Citations

External links

Flora of North America: Quercus garryana

Plants of British Columbia: Quercus garryana

 Province of British Columbia – Ministry of Environment: Garry Oak Ecosystem – PDF
Province of British Columbia – Ministry of Forests, Lands and Natural Resource Operations: Garry Oak
Garry Oak Ecosystems Recovery Team: Information about native plant gardening, propagation, removing invasive plants and events for beginners to professionals.
Oak Harbor Garry Oak Society: A nonprofit organization devoted to Garry oak conservation on Whidbey Island whose website includes helpful resources on planting and protecting Garry oaks, and contemporary news and updates on issues facing Garry oaks in the Puget Sound Region of Washington State.

garryana
Trees of British Columbia
Trees of the Northwestern United States
Trees of the Southwestern United States
Plants described in 1840
Garden plants of North America
Drought-tolerant trees